Mungo Haldane ( – 1 June 1755) was a Scottish politician who sat in the House of Commons intermittently between 1715 and 1727.

Haldane was the eldest son of John Haldane MP of Gleneagles and his wife Mary Drummond, daughter of David Drummond, 3rd Lord Maderty.

Haldane was returned unopposed as Member of Parliament (MP) for Stirlingshire at the 1715 general election. At the 1722 general election he was elected instead as MP for Dunbartonshire  but was unseated on petition on 23 January 1725. He was then elected MP for Perthshire at a by-election on 28 April 1726, but was defeated at the 1727 general election. In December 1730 he was appointed commissioner of police for Scotland and held the post until his death.

Haldane died unmarried on 1 June 1755.

References 
 

1682 births
Year of birth uncertain
Members of the Parliament of Great Britain for Scottish constituencies
British MPs 1715–1722
British MPs 1722–1727
1755 deaths